Ranchita (Spanish for "small ranch") is an unincorporated community in San Diego County, California. Ranchita has a ZIP code of 92066. A notable feature is the Rancheti, an 11-foot-tall (3.35 m), 300-pound (136.08 kg) fiberglass Yeti statue erected by local real estate broker Joe Rauh on Montezuma Valley Road in December 2007. The statue was featured on the March 4, 2016 installment of Zippy.

History
Before present-day Ranchita was founded, it was known as Cañada de la Verruga, a Spanish name meaning "Valley of the Wart" that was used by Spaniards and Native Americans. The area was later known as "Wid Helm's place," named after homesteader William Johnson Helm. Upon his arrival to the area, Helm constructed an adobe house just west of present-day Ranchita. Helm's property was popular with deer hunters who traveled long distances to hunt the area. After Helm vacated the area, land locators from Los Angeles brought in new homesteaders who settled there freely under the Homestead Acts, the informal founding of Ranchita.

The Verruga Post Office was founded in Ranchita on September 22, 1917. Several houses, a mine, and a school opened up around that time as the local population grew. Many of the new residents of the town left within a decade due to a lack of water. The post office was moved to Warner Springs on February 27, 1926.

There was a longstanding desire to construct a road connecting the town of Borrego Springs in the east to San Felipe, Warner Springs, and other western towns via Ranchita. The road long stood as a mere idea because Hellhole Canyon was an obstacle. The San Diego County Board of Supervisors denied a request to construct the road on April 5, 1937. Crews began construction on the road in 1955 but would not complete the project until 1964. The road was formally opened on June 24, 1964, and was celebrated for shortening the trip from Escondido to Borrego Springs by 14 miles. The highway, County Route S22, is known as Montezuma Valley Road in its stretch through Ranchita.

References

Unincorporated communities in San Diego County, California
Unincorporated communities in California